General Pao Pienlert Boripanyutakit (November 10, 1893March 4, 1970) was a Thai political figure who served as a Minister of Finance and Minister of Commerce.

Biography
Pao was the second oldest of 12 children. He lived and studied in military school in Thailand until the age of 16 at which time he went abroad to continue military study on full scholarship.  He first studied in Germany until World War I broke out, after which he was transferred to Switzerland and later to Paris when Thailand participated in World War I at École spéciale militaire de Saint-Cyr to complete his education. He also served as an assistant to the Defence Attaché at the embassy in Paris during his study and after graduation.

He returned to Thailand at the age of 28 and served as an army official until the King granted his official title as Phra Boripanyutakit at the age of 36. He was named one of the 19 highest-ranking officials in his nation's army, serving as a liaison between the Thai Army and the Allies force during World War I. He spoke fluent French, German, and English.

He served as the Minister of Commerce for 8 terms (February 12, 1935 to February 16, 1942, from May 29, 1948 to November 29, 1951, and again from March 31, 1957 to September 16, 1957).

He served as the Minister of Finance for two different terms, from December 17, 1941 – August 1, 1944 and December 8, 1951 – March 30, 1953.

He also served for a very brief period as Minister of Agriculture in 1951 in the aftermath of the Silent Coup.

His most notable contribution to finance was that he helped established the foreign currency exchange of Thailand in 1955. In commerce, he helped industrialize the enamelling process for porcelain and metals commercially, started the export program for the rice industry in Thailand, and helped to create the first seaport in Thailand.

References

Further reading
 

Pao Pienlert Boripanyutakit
Pao Pienlert Boripanyutakit
Pao Pienlert Boripanyutakit
Pao Pienlert Boripanyutakit
Pao Pienlert Boripanyutakit
Pao Pienlert Boripanyutakit
Pao Pienlert Boripanyutakit
École Spéciale Militaire de Saint-Cyr alumni
1893 births
1970 deaths
Pao Pienlert Boripanyutakit
Pao Pienlert Boripanyutakit